The year 1996 was the 215th year of the Rattanakosin Kingdom of Thailand. It was the 51st year of the reign of King Bhumibol Adulyadej (Rama IX) and is reckoned as the year 2539 in the Buddhist Era. Major events include the Golden Jubilee of Bhumibol Adulyadej

Incumbents
King: Bhumibol Adulyadej 
Crown Prince: Vajiralongkorn
Prime Minister: 
until 25 November: Banharn Silpa-Archa 
starting 25 November: Chavalit Yongchaiyudh
Supreme Patriarch: Nyanasamvara Suvaddhana

Event

January

February

March

April

May

June
9 June - Golden Jubilee of Bhumibol Adulyadej

July

August

September

October

November
25-26 November - His Majesty King Bhumibol Adulyadej welcomes U.S. President Bill Clinton for a State Visit.

December

Births

Deaths

See also
 1996 in Thai television
 List of Thai films of 1996

References

External links

 
Years of the 20th century in Thailand
Thailand
Thailand
1990s in Thailand